Eleodes is a genus of darkling beetles, family Tenebrionidae. They are commonly known as pinacate beetles or desert stink beetles. They are endemic to western North America, with many species found in the Sonoran Desert. The name pinacate is Mexican Spanish, derived from the Nahuatl (Aztec) name for the insect, pinacatl, which translates as "black beetle."

Eleodes species range from 8 to 40 mm in length and are black. All produce quinone or similar substances as a deterrent to predators, and many will stand on their heads to spray it. They are found in sandy environments.

Some species, such as the Wooly Darkling Beetle or Eleodes Osculans, are capable of flight.

See also
List of Eleodes species
El Pinacate y Gran Desierto de Altar Biosphere Reserve

References

External links
Desert USA – Stinkbugs

Tenebrionidae genera
Gran Desierto de Altar
Fauna of the Sonoran Desert
Taxa named by Johann Friedrich von Eschscholtz